Plesner is a Danish law firm. It was founded in 1918 and has grown through a series of mergers with other Danish law firms.

It deals with many areas of commercial law. Most of its work is international in nature. The company has 61 partners, and a total staff of about 425.

History

Plesner's history traces back to a law firm founded by Poul Jacobsen in 1918. Kaj Holm-Nielsen and Mogens Plesner became partners in the firm in 1949, which later assumed the name Holm-Nielsen & Plesner. The 1980s saw the first of a series of mergers with other law firms, which has led to the current company, known as Plesner since 2004. 
 1918 – Poul Jacobsen, Attorney-at-Law, establishes the firm that later becomes Holm-Nielsen & Plesner
 1933 – Oskar Bondo Svane, High Court Attorney, establishes the firm O. Bondo Svane
 1937 – Svend Lunøe and Carl Ricard, High Court Attorneys, establish firms that later become Lunøe & Partnere
 1940s – Jacob la Cour, High Court Attorney, establishes the law firm la Cour
 1958 – Kaj Holm-Nielsen and Mogens Plesner become partners in Poul Jacobsen's law firm. The firm later changes its name to Holm-Nielsen & Plesner
 1964 – Bornstein & Grønborg is founded by Jørgen Grønborg and Preben Bornstein
 1967 – Robert Koch-Nielsen joins the law firm la Cour as a partner, and the firm changes its name to la Cour & Koch-Nielsen after some years
 1987 – Lunøe & Partnere becomes the umbrella name of a number of small law firms, including the firm founded by Svend Lunøe and Carl Ricard
 1989 – Plesner & Lunøe is established through an office amalgamation of the law firms Holm-Nielsen & Plesner and Lunøe & Partnere
 1990 – Koch-Nielsen & Grønborg is established through a merger between the law firms la Cour & Koch-Nielsen and Bornstein & Grønborg
 1997 – Plesner & Grønborg is established through a merger between the law firms Plesner & Lunøe and Koch-Nielsen & Grønborg
 2000 – Plesner Svane Grønborg is established through a merger between the law firms O. Bondo Svane and Plesner & Grønborg
 2004 – Plesner Svane Grønborg's employees all move to the newly built domicile, the "Copper Tower", at Amerika Plads 37 – and Plesner is used as a logo and the firm goes by the name of Plesner
 2009 – Plesner Svane Grønborg changes its company name to Plesner

In March 2020, Plesner appointed Ascertus Limited as its implementation partner, to help the organization upgrade its work document and email management systems, as well as provide ongoing support and maintenance.

Corporate social responsibility
Plesner's CSR programme includes
 the School Project aimed at retaining children from lesser privileged areas of Copenhagen in school and keeping them focused on continued education
 a programme for developing and retaining talented female lawyers with the goal of increasing the percentage of the firm's woman partners.

References

External links
http://www.plesner.com

Law firms of Denmark
Service companies based in Copenhagen
Law firms established in 1918
1918 establishments in Denmark
Companies based in Copenhagen Municipality